Travelling Light is a 2003 Australian film directed by Kathryn Millard and starring Pia Miranda, Sacha Horler, and Anna Torv.

Horler won an Australian Film Institute award as Best Supporting Actress for her role in the film.

References

External links

Travelling Light at Urban Cinefile

Australian drama films
Films set in South Australia
2000s English-language films
2000s Australian films